In enzymology, a 2-acetolactate mutase is an enzyme that catalyzes the chemical reaction

2-acetolactate  3-hydroxy-3-methyl-2-oxobutanoate

Hence, this enzyme has one substrate, 2-acetolactate, and one product, 3-hydroxy-3-methyl-2-oxobutanoate.

This enzyme belongs to the family of isomerases, specifically those intramolecular transferases transferring other groups.  The systematic name of this enzyme class is 2-acetolactate methylmutase. Other names in common use include acetolactate mutase, and acetohydroxy acid isomerase.  This enzyme participates in valine, leucine and isoleucine biosynthesis.

References

 

EC 5.4.99
Ascorbate enzymes
Enzymes of unknown structure